Diaphana minuta is a species of gastropods belonging to the family Diaphanidae.

The species is found in Europe and North America, with a circumpolar distribution. It can be found in the intertidal zone.

References

Diaphanidae
Gastropods of Europe
Gastropods described in 1827